Svetlana Shcherbakova (born ) is a Russian weightlifter, who competed in the +63 kg category and represented Russia at international competitions. 

She won the silver medal at the 2014 Summer Youth Olympics.

Major results

References

External links
http://www.the-sports.org/svetlana-shcherbakova-weightlifting-spf278451.html
http://www.iwrp.net/component/cwyniki/?view=contestant&id_zawodnik=22121

https://www.youtube.com/watch?v=E0WxD7ar9Ng

1998 births
Living people
Russian female weightlifters
Place of birth missing (living people)
Weightlifters at the 2014 Summer Youth Olympics 
20th-century Russian women
21st-century Russian women